The 1918–19 season is the 45th season of competitive football by Rangers.

Overview
Rangers played a total of 34 competitive matches during the 1918–19 season. They finished second in the Scottish Football League after winning 26 of the 34 league matches and collecting a total of 57 points (one less than first-placed Celtic).

The Scottish Cup was not competed for this season as the Scottish Football Association had withdrawn the tournament due to the outbreak of the First World War.

Results
All results are written with Rangers' score first.

Scottish Football League

Appearances

See also
 1919 Victory Cup
 1918–19 in Scottish football

Rangers F.C. seasons
Rangers